Albert McCann (1 November 1941 – 9 January 2014) was an English footballer who played as a midfielder, winger or forward.

McCann began his career with Luton Town but made only 6 league appearances before joining Coventry City (22 League appearances). He moved to Portsmouth in 1962 and would enjoy a 12-year stay at the club, becoming a fan favourite and a regular scorer and creator of goals on the wings, in midfield or up front. He was inducted into the club's "Hall of Fame" in March 2011.

Notes

1941 births
2014 deaths
English footballers
Luton Town F.C. players
Coventry City F.C. players
Portsmouth F.C. players
People from Maidenhead
Association football midfielders